Forsyth is a given name. It may refer to:

Peter Forsyth Christensen (born 1952), American prelate of the Roman Catholic Church in Idaho
Joseph Forsyth Johnson (1840–1906), English landscape architect and disciple of John Ruskin
Robert Forsyth Macgeorge (1796–1859), early settler of South Australia, founder of the Adelaide suburb of Urrbrae
David Forsyth Main (1831–1880), 19th-century member of parliament in Otago, New Zealand
Charles Immanuel Forsyth Major (1843–1923), Swiss zoologist and vertebrate palaeontologist
Frederick Forsyth Pardee, KC (1866–1927), Ontario barrister and political figure
Ivor Forsyth Porter CMG, OBE (1913–2012), British Ambassador and author
Robert Forsyth Scott (1849–1933), mathematician, barrister and Master of St John's College, Cambridge
Sharpe, William Forsyth (born 1934), American economist
Thomas Forsyth Torrance, MBE, FRSE, FBA (1913–2007), Scottish Protestant theologian
John Forsyth Wright (1892–1947), Tasmanian politician
Annie Forsyth Wyatt (1885–1961), OBE, Australian community worker, conservationist, Red Cross worker

See also 
Forsyth (disambiguation)
Forsyth (surname)